Felicia bellidioides is a perennial plant of up to about  high, that is assigned to the family Asteraceae. Most of the narrowly inverted egg-shaped leaves are silky hairy and in a basal rosette with no or few very narrow bracts on the stalk in the subspecies bellidioides. In the subspecies foliosa, the narrower leaves are not silky hairy but variously bristly and glandular, with more and larger bracts on the inflorescence stalk. The flowerheads sit individually on top of a long peduncle and consist of an involucre with only two worls of bracts, about twenty purplish blue ray florets, surrounding many yellow disc florets. It occurs in the Western Cape province of South Africa.

Description 
Its leaves are set alternate along the stems (with the exception of the lowest pair that is opposite), mostly crowded in a basal rosette. In all forms the leaf margins rarely carry a few teeth.

Flowers and seeds 
The outer bracts are lance-shaped, about 1½ mm (0.06 in) wide, and carry long hairs or glandular bristles. The inner bracts are narrowly inverted egg-shaped and about 2 mm (0.08 in) wide, with a few hairs and a papery margin. These encircle numerous disc florets, with a yellow corolla of up to 3 mm long. Encircling the base of the corolla are many white, toothed, deciduous, pappus bristles of 2–3 mm (0.08–0.12 in) long.

Subspecies 
Felicia bellidioides subsp. foliata differs from the typical subspecies by having bracts higher up the peduncles, clearly stalked, longer and narrower leaves of 1–6 cm long and –4 mm wide, without the silky hairs.

Taxonomy 
Jürke Grau in his 1973 Revision of the genus Felicia (Asteraceae) distinguished a form with bracts higher up the peduncle, stalked, longer and narrower leaves without the silky hair characteristic of the typical form. He named it Felicia bellidioides subsp. foliata, the type of which has been collected by Barker on the Voetpadsberg between Worcester and Laingsburg in 1951. The species is considered to be part of the section Neodetris. The species name bellidioides has been compounded from the Latin bellis referring to the genus Bellis, and the Greek suffix -oides, which means "in the form of".

Distribution, habitat and ecology 
Felicia bellidioides subsp. bellidioides is known from the Hottentots Holland Mountains in the southwest to Matroosberg in the northeast. Isolated subpopulations of this subspecies also occurs in the Riviersonderend Mountains near Genadendal, the Groot Winterhoek Mountains near Gouda, the Anysberg, and the Klein Swartberg near Ladysmith. Subsp. foliosa borders the distribution a to the north and east, from the Cederberg, the Kouebokkeveld Mountains, Keeromsberg, the Witteberg near Laingsburg, Eendracht near Montagu, and the Swartberg Pass.

Conservation 
Both subspecies of Felicia bellidioides have a stable population and their continued survival is considered to be of least concern.

References

External links 
 Photos of Felicia bellidioides on iNaturalist
 Line drawing of Felicia bellidioides subsp. bellidioides
 Line drawing of Felicia bellidioides subsp. foliosa
 Distribution of both subspecies of Felicia bellidioides

bellidioides
Endemic flora of South Africa
Plants described in 1897